The 9th Robert Awards ceremony was held in 1992 in Copenhagen, Denmark. Organized by the Danish Film Academy, the awards honoured the best in Danish and foreign film of 1991.

Honorees

Best Danish Film 
 Europa – Lars von Trier

Best Screenplay 
 Marianne Goldman – Freud's Leaving Home

Best Actor in a Leading Role 
 Ole Lemmeke –

Best Actress in a Leading Role 
 Ghita Nørby – Freud's Leaving Home

Best Actor in a Supporting Role 
 Nikolaj Lie Kaas – The Boys from St. Petri

Best Actress in a Supporting Role 
 Jessica Zanden – Freud's Leaving Home

Best Cinematography 
 Henning Bendtsen – Europa

Best Production Design 
 Henning Bahs – Europa

Best Costume Design 
 Manon Rasmussen – The Boys from St. Petri

Best Makeup 
  – The Boys from St. Petri

Best Sound Design 
 Per Streit Jensen – Europa

Best Special Effects 
 Hummer Højmark, Morten Jacobsen & Kaj Grönberg – Europa

Best Editing 
 Hervé Schneid – Europa

Best Score 
  – Europa

Best Short Featurette 
 Lille dreng på Østerbro – Lasse Spang Olsen

Best Foreign Film 
 Dances with Wolves – Kevin Costner

See also 

 1992 Bodil Awards

References

External links 
  

1991 film awards
1992 in Denmark
Robert Awards ceremonies
1990s in Copenhagen